is a Japanese professional football club based in Yokohama, Kanagawa Prefecture, part of the Greater Tokyo Area. The club currently plays in the J1 League, the first tier of football in the country. The club was formed by fans of Yokohama Flügels as a protest against Flügels' merger with Yokohama Marinos in 1999, becoming the first supporter-owned professional sports team in Japan.

Since gaining J.League membership in 2001, Yokohama FC spent considerable time in the second tier of the Japanese football league system. The club gained promotion to J.League Division 1 for the 2007 season after winning the Division 2 title. However, YFC were immediately relegated in the following season. After 12 years in the J2 League, they returned to Japan's top tier, now called J1 League, for the 2020 season. History repeated itself, as they were relegated to J2 after finishing the season as J1's last-place team. The club was promoted again to J1 in 2022, their third stint in the first division.

Crest 
Yokohama FC's crest features a phoenix, symbolizing the rise of Yokohama FC from the ashes of the Yokohama Flugels. The blue ribbon on the top represents the Blue Ribbon Movement, a movement that began at the end of the 1998 J.League season to keep the Flugels alive.

History

Yokohama FC was formed on 25 December 1998 following the merger of Yokohama's two J.League clubs, the Flügels and the Marinos. Flügels supporters felt that their club had essentially been dissolved rather than merged with, so rejected the suggestion that they should start supporting Marinos – who had been their crosstown rivals. Instead, with money raised through donations from the general public and an affiliation with talent management company IMG, the former Flügels supporters founded the Yokohama Fulie Sports Club. Following the socio model used by FC Barcelona, the Fulie Sports Club created Yokohama FC, the first professional sports team in Japan owned and operated by its supporters.

For its first season in 1999, Yokohama FC hired former Germany national team and World Cup star Pierre Littbarski to be the manager and Yasuhiko Okudera, the first Japanese footballer to play professionally in Europe, to be the chairman. The club attempted to gain entry directly into the professional J.League, but the Japan Football Association only permitted entry to the amateur Japan Football League (JFL), at the time the third level of the Japanese football league system, and ruled that the club would not be eligible for promotion into J.League Division 2 at the end of its first season. So, despite finishing as JFL champion in 1999, Yokohama FC finished as JFL champion again in 2000 before being promoted to J.League Division 2.

The club spent the next 6 seasons in J.League Division 2 before finishing as champions in 2006 and gaining promotion to J.League Division 1. In 2007, just the ninth year of its existence, Yokohama FC played its first season in the top flight of Japanese football. After a poor season, the team were consigned to relegation with five games of the season still remaining. Despite their early relegation, Yokohama FC nevertheless decided the final outcome at the opposite end of the table; by defeating title contenders Urawa Red Diamonds on the last day of the season, Kashima Antlers secured the J.League Division 1 title.

In 2018, Yokohama FC narrowly missed out on automatic promotion by goal difference. The team made it to the J2 promotion final, losing to Tokyo Verdy on an stoppage time winner. In 2019, Yokohama finished second in J2 and gained automatic promotion to J1.

After finishing in last place in 2021, Yokohama FC would be relegated back to J2 for the 2022 season.

Fight for promotion in 2005 and 2006
Although they had a dire season in 2005, ending 11th out of 12, they were in the top half of table throughout the 2006 season. On 26 November they finished in the top spot of the J2 League, and hence were finally promoted to the J. League 1.

This success story was so dramatic as to make people somewhat excited in Japan. Yokohama FC's financial situation was so poor that they didn't even own their own football ground or a club house. Players did everything themselves including carrying the goal posts and washing the jerseys.

One of their players, Kazuyoshi Miura, is 54 and a former player, Atsuhiro Miura (one of their main players before his 2010 retirement) was 36 when he last played for the club. These players once played for the Japan national team.

They lost all pre-season matches, even against college students, then also the first official match of the year. After this, they suddenly changed the player-manager to a freshman with little experience named Takuya Takagi, who was 38. At the beginning of the season few expected them to become champions.

Record as J.League member

Key

Honours
Japan Football League
Champions: 1999, 2000
J.League Division 2
Champions: 2006
Runner-ups: 2019, 2022

Current players

Out on loan

Reserve squad (U-18s)
; Squad for the 2022 season.

Colours
As they could not adopt directly Flügels' white and blue strip given its similarity to that of Marinos, Yokohama FC decided to adopt an all-cyan kit, after NKK SC, a former company club which had closed in 1994. NKK SC was based in Kawasaki and played most matches at Todoroki Athletics Stadium, but used Mitsuzawa Stadium on days when the other Kawasaki clubs at the time (Verdy Kawasaki, Toshiba and Fujitsu) used it.

Kit evolution

Coaching staff
For the 2023 season.

Managerial history

Mascot 
The Yokohama FC's mascot is named Fulie-maru, an alien-bird like figure. He is, supposedly, a tribute to Yokohama Flugels' mascot, Tobimaru, a flying squirrel.

References

External links

  

 
J.League clubs
Football clubs in Japan
Association football clubs established in 1999
Sports teams in Yokohama
Fan-owned football clubs
1999 establishments in Japan
Japan Football League clubs
Multi-sport clubs in Japan
Phoenix clubs (association football)